Mi Tzu Quan (literally "rice ancestor") is a Northern Chinese martial art that uses fast, clear, long-ranged movements and is similar to Chaquan and Shaolin Quan.

Style
Much like Chaquan and Meihuaquan, two similar styles, both belonging to the 'Long fist' category of shaolin martial arts, Mi Tzu Quan uses elegant multi-direction strikes, such as striking low and forward with the front fist while striking high and behind with the back fist.

Appearances in Pop Culture
The Mi Tzu style is used by the character Smoke in Mortal Kombat: Deception and its sequel, Mortal Kombat Armageddon.

Chinese martial arts